Bedulita is a comune (municipality) in the Province of Bergamo in the Italian region of Lombardy, located about  northeast of Milan and about  northwest of Bergamo.

Bedulita borders the following municipalities: Berbenno, Capizzone, Costa Valle Imagna, Roncola, Sant'Omobono Imagna.

References